MPI Media Group is an American producer, distributor and licensor of theatrical film and home entertainment. MPI's subsidiaries include MPI Pictures, MPI Home Video, Gorgon Video, and the horror film distributor Dark Sky Films. The company is located in Orland Park, Illinois, and was founded in 1976 by brothers Malik & Waleed Ali.

MPI also owns the stock footage archive WPA Film Library, which offers one of the industry's largest collections of music performances, newsreels, political coverage and pop culture footage and the British Pathe Newsreel Archive. The company was originally started in 1976 as Maljack Productions, Inc.

The company branched out into video distribution in 1983. One of the first titles, The Beatles' movie A Hard Day's Night, which honored the movie's 20th anniversary was an instant best seller on the Billboard Videocassette Top 40. Maljack had branched out into the vintage TV show genre with The Prisoner serving as one of the first titles to come out of the MPI Home Video label. They eventually became a leader in the vintage television show industry, along with Paramount Home Video.

In 1984, Maljack introduced the Gorgon Video line. In 1985, Maljack released a series of videocassettes featuring the lost episodes of the vintage Jackie Gleason TV show The Honeymooners. Maljack also released shows via licensing agreements with such distributors like ITC Entertainment, as well as Captain Kangaroo. In 1986, Maljack Productions, Inc. (MPI) released the David Selznick-produced Ronald Reagan documentary Reagan's Way, which was originally commissioned for French TV.

Also, in 1986, Doc Projects Inc. had signed a deal with Maljack Productions in order to release its first documentary, Great Crimes of the Century. In 1987, Maljack Productions, Inc. was officially shortened to MPI. In 1987, Frank Zappa's Honker Home Video had signed a distribution deal with MPI in order to release their titles on videocassette.

MPI Home Video releases

Film & documentaries
 Reagans' Way (1986)
Dark Shadows: Behind the Scenes (made in 1991 & released in 2001)
 Dark Shadows 30th Anniversary Tribute (made in 1996 & released in 2001)
 Catfight (2016)
 Reunion (2020)
 Dark Shadows and Beyond: The Jonathan Frid Story (2021)
Other films here (https://mpimedia.com/productions/)

TV series

 A Touch of Frost
 The Adventures of Sherlock Holmes
 The Beverly Hillbillies
 The Big Easy
 The Case-Book of Sherlock Holmes
 Captain Kangaroo
 The Cisco Kid
 Close to You: Remembering The Carpenters
 Dark Shadows
 The Doris Day Show
 The Donna Reed Show
 Family Affair
 The Girls Next Door
 Here's Lucy
 The Color Honeymooners
 The Invisible Man
 The IT Crowd
 My Favorite Martian
 My Living Doll
 Petticoat Junction
 Pulling
 The Rich Little Show
 The Return of Sherlock Holmes
 The Mothers-in-Law
 The Prisoner
 The Vice
 Lucille Ball TV specials

References

External links
 Official site
 MPI Home Video

Home video companies of the United States
Companies based in Cook County, Illinois
Orland Park, Illinois
1976 establishments in Illinois